The 2022 season is Kaya F.C.–Iloilo's 5th season in the Philippines Football League and 4th in the Copa Paulino Alcantara. Kaya will also compete in the AFC Champions League qualifying Preliminary round and the AFC Cup.

The season saw a lot of changes in the lineup of the club. Masanari Omura, who had been with the club since 2011, decided to retire, as well as keeper Louie Casas. Foreign player Patrick Asare departed the club, with local players Dylan de Bruycker and Marwin Angeles moving to Nakhon Ratchasima and Persik Kediri, respectively. Kenshiro Daniels left the club to be closer to his family in the United States, eventually joining rivals United City F.C. in March. Kaya also made a number of signings, including Philippines national football team prospect Jesse Curran, Oskari Kekkonen, Mar Diano, and Sandro Reyes from the Azkals Development Team, as well as the ADT's Jarvey Gayoso, who had previously played for the club on loan in the 2021 AFC Champions League. 2018 Philippines Football League top scorer and Senegalese forward Robert Lopez Mendy also rejoined the club from Svay Rieng in Cambodia.

Players

Squad information 
As of August 9,  2022

Transfers 
Note: Flags indicate national team as defined under FIFA eligibility rules. Players may hold more than one non-FIFA nationality.

In

Out

Kits
Supplier:  LGR / 
Sponsor: LBC

Preseason and friendlies

Friendlies

Competitions

Overview

Philippines Football League

Copa Paulino Alcantara

Elimination round

Knock-out stage

Semi-finals

Final

AFC Champions League

Qualifying preliminary round

AFC Cup

Group stage

The draw for the group stage was held on 17 January 2022 at the AFC House in Kuala Lumpur, Malaysia. Kaya were drawn into Group G alongside Malaysia Super League runners-up Kedah Darul Aman, Indonesia Liga 1 champions Bali United, Hun Sen Cup winners Visakha. All matches will be held in Denpasar, Bali, Indonesia.

Statistics

Appearances

Goalscorers

Top assists

Clean sheets

Notes

References 

Kaya-Iloilo 2022
Kaya-Iloilo 2022